Conosa is a grouping of Amoebozoa. It is subdivided into three groups – Archamoebae, Variosea (paraphyletic) and Mycetozoa (polyphyletic).

In some classifications, the mycetozoan Myxogastria and Dictyostelia are united in Macromycetozoa.

Conosa includes the species Dictyostelium discoideum and Entamoeba histolytica, among others.

References

 
Taxa named by Thomas Cavalier-Smith
Amorphea subphyla